Waseca County is a county in the U.S. state of Minnesota. As of the 2020 census, the population was 18,968. Its county seat is Waseca.

History
In 1849, the newly organized Minnesota Territory legislature authorized nine counties across the territory. One of those, Dakota, was partially subdivided in 1853 to create Blue Earth, Le Sueur, and Rice counties. In 1855, parts of those counties were partitioned to create Steele. On February 27, 1857, the territorial legislature authorized partitioning western Steele County to create Waseca County, with its seat at Wilton, a settlement which began in 1854. The county name was taken from the area's first farming settlement, started in 1855, near the present location of the city of Waseca. That settlement name came from the Dakota word meaning "rich," a reference to the fertile soil in the area.

The Winona and Saint Peter Railroad line past the town of Waseca was completed in the latter half of the 1860s, causing the town to bloom. By 1870 the vote was taken to relocate the county seat to that settlement.

Waseca County's boundaries have not changed since its creation.

Geography

The Le Sueur River flows westward through the county toward its confluence with the Blue Earth River in Blue Earth County. It is augmented by the Little Le Sueur, which drains the southeast part of the county. Bull Run Creek flows westward from Silver Lake through the lower central part of the county into Blue Earth County; the Little Cobb River rises in southern Waseca County and flows westward into Blue Earth County to its confluence with the Cobb River.

The county terrain consists of low rolling hills, carved by drainages and dotted with lakes. The area is devoted to agriculture wherever possible. The terrain slopes to the north and west, with its highest point near its southeast corner, at 1,240' (378m) ASL.

Waseca is one of seven southern Minnesota counties that have no forest ecosystems, only prairie and savanna soils.

Major highways

  U.S. Highway 14
  Minnesota State Highway 13
  Minnesota State Highway 30
  Minnesota State Highway 60 (runs along north border of county only)
  Minnesota State Highway 83
 Minnesota State Highway 230

Adjacent counties

 Rice County - northeast
 Steele County - east
 Freeborn County - southeast
 Faribault County - southwest
 Blue Earth County - west
 Le Sueur County - northwest

Protected areas

 Findley State Wildlife Management Area
 Kanne State Wildlife Management Area
 Moonan State Wildlife Management Area
 Mueller State Wildlife Management Area
 Senn-Rich State Wildlife Management Area
 Teal State Wildlife Management Area
 Waseca State Wildlife Management Area

Lakes

 Buffalo Lake
 Clear Lake
 Everson Lake
 Goose Lake
 Hayes Lake
 Knutsen Lake
 Lake Elysian (part)
 Lilly Lake
 Lily Lake (part)
 Loon Lake
 Mott Lake
 Reeds Lake
 Reese Lake
 Rice Lake (Janesville Township)
 Rice Lake (Woodville Township)
 Saint Olaf Lake
 Sibert Lake
 Silver Lake
 Toners Lake
 Trenton Lake (part)
 Watkins Lake

Demographics

2000 census

As of the 2000 census, there were 19,526 people, 7,059 households, and 4,990 families in the county. The population density was 46.2/sqmi (17.8/km2). There were 7,427 housing units at an average density of 17.6/sqmi (6.78/km2). The racial makeup of the county was 94.65% White, 2.26% Black or African American, 0.59% Native American, 0.46% Asian, 0.03% Pacific Islander, 1.29% from other races, and 0.71% from two or more races. 2.90% of the population were Hispanic or Latino of any race. 47.6% were of German, 15.5% Norwegian, 7.4% Irish and 5.5% American ancestry.

There were 7,059 households, of which 34.7% had children under the age of 18 living with them, 59.0% were married couples living together, 7.8% had a female householder with no husband present, and 29.3% were non-families. 25.1% of all households were made up of individuals, and 10.70% had someone living alone who was 65 or older. The average household size was 2.56 and the average family size was 3.07.

The county population contained 25.8% under 18, 8.7% from 18 to 24, 30.0% from 25 to 44, 21.3% from 45 to 64, and 14.2% who were 65 or older. The median age was 36. For every 100 females there were 109.3 males. For every 100 females 18 and over, there were 111.3 males.

The median income for a household in the county was $42,440, and the median income for a family was $50,081. Males had a median income of $34,380 versus $22,630 for females. The per capita income was $18,631. About 4.5% of families and 6.5% of the population were below the poverty line, including 8.8% of those under 18 and 5.8% of those 65 or over.

2020 Census

Communities

Cities

 Elysian (part)
 Janesville
 New Richland
 Waldorf
 Waseca (county seat)

Unincorporated communities

 Alma City
 Lake Elysian
 Matawan
 Otisco
 Palmer
 Saint Mary
 Smiths Mill
 Vista
 Wilton

Townships

 Alton Township
 Blooming Grove Township
 Byron Township
 Freedom Township
 Iosco Township
 Janesville Township
 New Richland Township
 Otisco Township
 St. Mary Township
 Vivian Township
 Wilton Township
 Woodville Township

Politics
Waseca County has traditionally voted Republican. In only three presidential elections since 1936 has the county selected the Democratic nominee (as of 2020).

See also
 National Register of Historic Places listings in Waseca County, Minnesota

References

External links
 Waseca.com - Waseca's Information Site
 Waseca County government’s website

 
Minnesota counties
Minnesota placenames of Native American origin
1857 establishments in Minnesota Territory
Populated places established in 1857